Diane E Lansley (married name White - born 1953), is a female former swimmer who competed for England.

Swimming career
She represented England and won a gold medal in the 100 metres butterfly and a silver medal in the 4 x 100 metres medley relay, at the 1970 British Commonwealth Games in Edinburgh, Scotland.

References

1953 births
Living people
English female swimmers
Commonwealth Games medallists in swimming
Commonwealth Games gold medallists for England
Commonwealth Games silver medallists for England
Swimmers at the 1970 British Commonwealth Games
Medallists at the 1970 British Commonwealth Games